Grigoryants, Grigoriants and Grigorýanc are transliterations of the Russian surname Григорьянц (of Armenian origin) and the Armenian surname Գրիգորյանց. People with those names include:

 Alexander Grigoryants (active late 1960s - early 1970s), Armenian-Soviet rugby union player
 Boris Grigorýanc (active from 2005), Turkmen football manager
 Elena Grigoryants (born 1965), Soviet and Russian culturologist, art critic 
 Grigory Sarkisovich Grigoryants (1919-1982), Soviet surgeon
 Norat Ter-Grigoryants (born 1936), Soviet and Armenian lieutenant-general
 Sergei Grigoryants (born 1941), Soviet dissident and former political prisoner, journalist, and literary critic
 Sergey Grigoriants (born 1983), Russian Grandmaster chess player

Armenian-language surnames